Vana-Roosa is a settlement in Rõuge Parish, Võru County in southeastern Estonia. It contains a church, manor house and lake.

References

Villages in Võru County